Matiur Rahman Mallik (died 24 January 1969) was a Bengali national activist. He was killed by the Pakistani police during 1969 uprising in East Pakistan. He received the Independence Day Award from the Government of Bangladesh in 2018.

Background
Malik was the son of Azhar Ali Mallik from Sabujbagh, Dhaka. He was a Standard IX student of Nabakumar Institution when he took part in a street march demanding autonomy for East Pakistan, the future country of Bangladesh. The uprising has historic significance and its spirit awakened people to fight for democracy and basic human rights, as it eventually led to the independence of Bangladesh.

Commemoration
Bangladesh observes 24 January as Mass Uprising Day. Every year different social, cultural organisations and political parties do elaborate programmes in observance of the day. Malik's monument was erected at Nabakumar Institute, Bakshibazar, Dhaka.

References

1969 deaths
Pakistani activists
Year of birth missing
Causes and prelude of the Bangladesh Liberation War
Recipients of the Independence Day Award